Norman S. Hubbard FRPSL is an American philatelist and former chairman of the Philatelic Foundation. He was appointed to the Roll of Distinguished Philatelists in 1996. He is a fellow of the Royal Philatelic Society London. Hubbard is a specialist in the philately of South America and Uruguay in particular.

References

American philatelists
Living people
Signatories to the Roll of Distinguished Philatelists
Fellows of the Royal Philatelic Society London
Philately of Uruguay
Year of birth missing (living people)